João Fernando Cotrim de Figueiredo (born 24 June 1961) is a Portuguese businessman and Liberal Initiative politician. He was the party's first member of the Assembly of the Republic, for the Lisbon District, in October 2019. He was the leader of the party between October 2019 and January 2023, during which the party won eight seats in the 2022 election.

Education and career
Cotrim de Figueiredo grew up in Lisbon, where he sold clothes hangers door-to-door for a company established by his great-grandfather. He attended the German School Lisbon before studying Economics at the London School of Economics, and then obtained a Masters in Business Administration from the NOVA University Lisbon.

He worked in executive positions at Compal, Nutricafés, Privado Holding and TVI. In 2015 he was elected vice president of the European Travel Commission, while also being president of the board at Turismo de Portugal.

Politics
In July 2019, Cotrim de Figueiredo was chosen to head the Liberal Initiative's list in Lisbon District for the October legislative elections. He became the party's only Assembly member, in their first elections.

After the resignation of Carlos Guimarães Pinto, Cotrim de Figueiredo ran for leader of the party in December 2019 and was elected with 96% of the votes.

In the snap election in January 2022, the Liberal Initiative received 5% of all votes, rising from one seat to eight and forming a parliamentary group. Cotrim de Figueiredo said that the group would be a firm opposition to socialism.

On 22 January 2023, Cotrim de Figueiredo was succeeded as leader of the Liberal Initiative by Rui Rocha, whom he had endorsed.

See also
Liberalism in Portugal

References

External links
João Cotrim de Figueiredo at Assembly of the Republic (in Portuguese)

1961 births
Living people
Alumni of the London School of Economics
NOVA University Lisbon alumni
20th-century Portuguese economists
Businesspeople from Lisbon
Members of the Assembly of the Republic (Portugal)
Liberal Initiative people
21st-century Portuguese economists